Ryan Andrew Duncan (born 18 January 2004) is a Scottish professional footballer who plays for Aberdeen as a midfielder.

References

2004 births
Living people
Scottish footballers
Scotland youth international footballers
Aberdeen F.C. players
Scottish Professional Football League players
Association football midfielders
Peterhead F.C. players
Footballers from Aberdeenshire